Marek Blaževič (born 1 September 2001) is a Lithuanian professional basketball player for Monbus Obradoiro of the Spanish Liga ACB.

Professional career
Blaževič made his professional debut with BC Perlas on 2017–18 season.

On 6 June 2018 he signed with Rytas Vilnius. He made his LKL debut on 23 September 2018, against Juventus Utena. In his second professional game with Rytas, he scored 13 points, drawing attention of local media. Playing for the Lietuvos rytas Vilnius under-18 team, Blaževič won the 2018 EuroLeague Basketball Next Generation Tournament. He was selected to All-tournament team.

On 29 June 2020, he signed with Žalgiris Kaunas.

On July 2, 2022, he has signed with Monbus Obradoiro of the Spanish Liga ACB.

References

2001 births
Living people
Basketball players from Vilnius
BC Rytas players
Centers (basketball)
Lithuanian people of Polish descent
Obradoiro CAB players